The Community Development Capital Initiative (CDCI) was a 2010 United States Treasury initiative that invested $570 million in small banks and credit unions as part of the Troubled Asset Relief Program (TARP) bailout.  Eligible institutions had to be designated community development financial institutions (CDFI's).  CDFI's attempt to make 60 percent of their loans to underserved communities.  In exchange, they are eligible for special federal capital assistance.

References

United States Department of the Treasury
2010 establishments in the United States